Union Township is a township in Crawford County, Iowa, USA.  As of the 2000 census, its population was 876.

Geography
According to the USGS, it contains two cemeteries: Butler and Dow City.

The streams of Buss Creek, Paradise Creek, Welsh Creek and Willow Creek run through this township.

References
 USGS Geographic Names Information System (GNIS)

External links
 US-Counties.com
 City-Data.com

Townships in Crawford County, Iowa
Townships in Iowa